Human Relief Foundation  (HRF) is a charity set up by the United Kingdom in 1991.
Since the last war on Iraq (2003), HRF paid attention for the training courses for doctors.
It sent a considerable number of medical staff from the UK to help train the Iraqi doctors on various subjects.
HRF thinks that the need for qualified doctors in Iraq is increasing as a result of the deteriorating situation. So it is aiming to train 5,000 doctors during the coming years, hoping that they will keep them updated with the latest knowledge of medicine available in the world.

HRF responds to the emergency situations by providing aid to the damaged areas in different parts of the world, and it tries to reduce the major losses caused by these disasters. HRF was one of the charities in the UK which participated to raise up to £500,000 as response to the earthquake happened in Sri Lanka in 2004.

HRF working to improve the living standards of the people who are in need through preparing a number of development programmes, and the director of Human Relief Foundation Nabeel Ramadhani said that HRF has helped the Palestinian refugees in Lebanon and Jordan, although there is no office in the Palestinian territories.

References

External links 
 www.hrf.org.uk Human Relief Foundation WorldWide

Charities based in West Yorkshire
Health charities in the United Kingdom
Organisations based in Bradford